Aka are pre-arranged sets of movement or forms in the Burmese martial arts. They serve as a straightforward way of passing down all of a style's techniques unto the student. They can be practiced as a form of physical conditioning, to develop muscle memory, or demonstrated as part of a public performance.

Aka in Hanthawaddy Bando
The Hanthawaddy style contains nine basic forms and nine animal forms, as well as several weapon forms.

Basic forms

Point form (Protecting the territory)
Square form (Defensive stepping)
Cross form (Balance and movement)
T-form (Counter-attack)
Triangle form (Deceptive defense)
Circle form (Evasive defense)
Points star form (Salutation to nature/night)
Sun form (Salutation to the sun)
Line form (Salutation to warrior monks)

Animal forms

Boar
Bull
Cobra: The cobra form emphasizes lightning quick strikes similar to the strikes of a cobra.
Eagle: The eagle form resembles an eagle in flight by using varying angles and types of attack.
Panther
Python
Scorpion
Tiger
Viper

Weapon forms

Long stick: Four Winds, Four Corners, Horseman, Pilgrim staff
Medium stick and short stick
Staff: Mandalay staff, Min dha, Monk dha
Animal staff: Cobra, Tiger, Boar, Eagle

See also
Burmese martial arts
Bando
Banshay

See also
Kata

References
Bando, philosophy, principles et practice, M.Gyi, IST edition, 2000

Burmese martial arts
Kata